Sathyam Paranja Viswasikkuvo is a 2019 Indian Malayalam-language family drama film directed by G. Prajith and written by Sajeev Pazhoor. The film stars Biju Menon and Samvrutha Sunil, with Alencier Ley Lopez, Sudhi Koppa, Dinesh Prabhakar, and Mangal in supporting roles. The film was released on 12 July 2019 to positive reviews from critics.

Plot
Suni is a daily wages worker, who lives in a modest house with his wife Geetha and their daughter. Geetha had left her home to be with Suni and is pretty sad about her husband’s drinking habit. 
One night Suni finds a lorry that has just met with an accident. He is excited seeing that the lorry was carrying bottles of foreign liquor. He calls his friends and they decide to loot some boxes of liquor. Their troubles start from then on.

Cast

 Biju Menon as Suni
 Samvrutha Sunil as Geetha (Suni's wife)
 Alencier Ley Lopez as Karuppai
 Sudhi Koppa as Thamara/Abhilash 
 Dinesh Prabhakar as Prasad
 Mangal as Shanavaz
 Johny Antony as George Kutty 
 Jaffar Idukki as Rameshan (George Kutty's neighbor)
 Sruthy Jayan as Jessy (Highway Jessy)
 Sreelakshmi as Annamma
 Saiju Kurup as Kuryan (Jessy's neighbor)
 Bhagath Manuel as Sulfy
 Srikant Murali as S.I Aboobakkar
 Rajan Pootharakkal
 Sudheesh as Mash
 Vettukili Prakash as Antony (Hotel Owner)
 Sumangal
 Muhammad Musthafa
 Arun as Geetha's brother
 G. Suresh Kumar as Geetha's father
 Dharmajan Bolgatty as A. Vincent

Production
Biju Menon was approached by writer Pazhoor for the lead role, he agreed to do the role after liking the one-line story. After six months, Pazhoor completed the full screenplay. The female lead role was finalized after the filming began. While they were looking for a suitable actress it was Menon who contacted Samvrutha, she immediately agreed after hearing the story. The film marks the return of Samvrutha in films after a hiatus. Samvrutha filmed for 20 days. The film was shot in a well developed village (Monthal) which is famous for its natural resources and infrastructure between Mahé and Thalassery and in parts of Kannur and Kozhikode. About the film's title, Pazhoor said "You can connect it to Suni. His nature is such that you can't trust him easily until he emphasises that he is telling the truth,".

Soundtrack
The film features songs composed by Shaan Rahman and Vishwajit, while the background scoring was done by Bijibal. Soundtrack album was released by Goodwill Entertainments.

Release
Sathyam Paranja Viswasikkuvo was released on 12 July 2019.

Critical reception
Upon release, the film received positive reviews from critics. Rating 4 out of 5 stars The Times of India wrote: "Sathyam Paranja Viswasikkuvo works because of the storytelling, but also because everyone seems to have done their best ... Working with a wonderful little screenplay, G Prajith has crafted a superb story that shows you can make a compelling movie without bombastic dialogues, action scenes or even a big star cast". The Hindu wrote "Sathyam Paranja Vishwasikkuvo is a believable tale that hits home".

References

External links
 
 

2010s Malayalam-language films
Films shot in Kannur
Films shot in Thalassery
Films shot in Kozhikode
Indian family films
Films about labour